Reg Ellis may refer to two cricketers:
Reg Ellis (Australian sportsman) (1891–1959), played cricket for Victoria and competed in the Victorian Football League
Reg Ellis (cricketer, born 1917), played cricket for the Australian Services cricket team and South Australia